Huang Tingting (born September 8, 1992 in Nanjing, Jiangsu, China) is a Chinese idol singer. She is a member of Team NII of Chinese idol group SNH48, of which she served as vice-captain from February 13, 2015 to December 22, 2017.

Career

SNH48 activities

2013 
On August 18, Huang was among the 34 shortlisted candidates for second-generation members of SNH48, and made her debut at Team NII's 1st Stage, "Theater no Megami" on 2 November. On 11 November, it was announced that Huang will be one of 24 members in Team NII during the team inauguration ceremony. On 16 November, she participated in SNH48's first major concert, "SNH48 Guangzhou Concert", held in the Guangzhou International Sports Arena.

On December 6, Huang accepted the “Most Potential Combination” award on behalf of SNH48 group at the 6th Top Chinese Music Chart Breakthrough New Artist Awards. Huang and other SNH48 members performed the debut single "Heavy Rotation " and the title track of the album "Fortune Cookie of Love " to open the awards ceremony. On December 31, Huang participated in Dragon TV's “New Year’s Eve concert” themed "Dream of Oriental Life". The dancing movements were representative of the group making a “fireball”, to signify passing love to everyone.

2014 
On January 18, Huang participated in the first anniversary concert, a “Red and White PK Concert” for SNH48 in Shanghai. Huang was in Team NII, and the major PK competition was between Team SII and Team NII. The winner was determined by fan votes. On March 30, Huang represented SNH48 to accept the ERC Chinese Top Ten Best New Artist Award. On July 4, she participated in the original season of the variety show "SNHello Xingmeng Academy" which was planned and launched by SNH48. It was the first Chinese variety show exclusively for idol groups. On July 26, she participated the first General Election of SNH48, but not placing in the top 16.

2015 
In January, Huang was appointed vice-captain of Team NII of 13 February and filmed her first music video, "Manatsu no Sounds Good!" at Saipan. On 25 July, she was ranked fourth in SNH48's second General Election, and on 26 December, she performed the song, "Oshibe to Meshibe to Yoru no Chouchou" with Li Yitong at the Request Hour Setlist Best 30 2015 Concert (2nd Edition), and came in first. As an award, she was given the chance to release her first solo single, "Youth Flash".

2016 
On February 27, Huang received more than 460,000 votes on live show of "National Pretty Girl". During the voting period, several servers were paralyzed due to so many voters trying to vote at the same time. This still holds the record for the highest votes in this live show's history. On March 18, her music video "Night Butterfly" debuted. Huang was allowed to film this music video as her reward for General Music Election BEST30. This music video was filmed in South Korea. On April 1, Huang got her first center in the music video “Engine of Youth;” this is also the SNH48's first original single. On May 3, Huang’s first solo music video, "Youth Flash" was officially released. On May 20, “Dream Land” was released. It is a group EP, which was filmed in Mauritius, Africa and combines many African musical elements. On 8 July 2016, Huang joined the first episode of The Amazing Race China 3, which was Chinese reality television series about sport race, and Huang was paired with groupmate Sun Rui as cast members. On 30 July, during SNH48's third General Election, Huang was ranked third with 130,258.3 votes. On November 25, she participated in the variety show "Let's go! idol" ("抱走吧！爱豆").

2017 
On February 26, Huang was a guest on the talk show Roast! She served as the “Talk King” or host for the episode. On May 10, Huang participated the celebrity cooking competition reality show "Xian Chu Dang Dao" ("鲜厨当道”). On June 9, Huang played a role in drama “Stairway to Stardom”. Huang's character is a popular actress named Chen Yurou. On June 26, she starred as a small princess in an ancient fantasy network drama called "Cover The Sky". On July, during SNH48's fourth General Election, Huang came in third with 165193.8 votes. On December 22, Huang resigned from her position as vice-captain of Team NII in light of an internal conflict within the team involving member Li Yitong.

2018 
On April 7, She participated in the first SNH48 Idol Sport Games. On May 4, Huang performed the song “The Best Stage” to express the concept of creation and dreaming the future. In July, during SNH48's fifth General Election, Huang came in second.

2019 
On May 10, Huang participated the third original public performance of SNH48 team NII, "The Scroll of Time" ("时之卷"). On December 19, Huang announced her termination of her contract with Shanghai Star48 Culture Media Group Co.LTD.

Solo activities
Huang made her official acting debut in the horror short film Souvenirs.
She made her small-screen debut in romance drama Stairway to Stardom (2017), playing a supporting role as a top celebrity. The following year, she was cast in her first lead role in fantasy drama Cover The Sky (2018). 
Huang was also cast in the romance comedy drama Cyrano Agency, and campus music drama So Young.

Discography

Filmography

Film

Television series

Variety show

SNH48activities

EPs

Albums
 Mae Shika Mukanee (2014)

Units

SNH48 Stage Units

Concert units

References

External links
 Official Member Profile 
 
 

1992 births
Actresses from Nanjing
Chinese film actresses
Chinese television actresses
Living people
Singers from Nanjing
21st-century Chinese actresses
SNH48 members
The Amazing Race contestants